freedesktop.org (fd.o) is a project to work on interoperability and shared base technology for free-software desktop environments for the X Window System (X11) and Wayland on Linux and other Unix-like operating systems. It was founded by Havoc Pennington, a GNOME developer working for Red Hat in March 2000. Some of the project's servers are hosted by Portland State University, sponsored by Hewlett-Packard, Intel, and Google.

Widely used open-source X-based desktop projects, such as GNOME, KDE's Plasma Desktop, and Xfce, are collaborating with the freedesktop.org project. In 2006, the project released Portland 1.0 (xdg-utils), a set of common interfaces for desktop environments. However, freedesktop.org is a "collaboration zone" for standards and specifications where users can freely discuss ideas, and not a formal standards organization.

freedesktop.org was formerly known as the X Desktop Group, and the abbreviation "XDG" remains common in their work.

freedesktop.org joined the X.Org Foundation in 2019.

All freedesktop.org projects are covered by Coraline Ada Ehmke's Contributor Covenant code of conduct which aims to ensure a harassment-free and inclusive environment for developers by prohibiting offensive language and behavior.

Hosted projects
freedesktop.org provides hosting for a number of relevant projects. These include:

Windowing system and graphics

Software related to windowing systems and graphics in general
 Cairo, a vector graphics library with cross-device output support
 Direct Rendering Infrastructure (DRI), Linux API to access the graphics hardware, used by X11, Wayland compositors, Mesa 3D, etc.
 Glamor, 2D graphics common driver for X server, it supports a variety of graphics chipsets which have supports for OpenGL/EGL/GBM APIs
 Mesa 3D, an implementation of several graphics API such as Vulkan and OpenGL
 Pixman, is a low-level software library for pixel manipulation, providing features such as image compositing and trapezoid rasterization. Important users of pixman are the cairo graphics library and the X.Org Server
 Poppler, a PDF rendering library
 Video Acceleration API
 Wayland, protocol to replace X11; features: no tearing, lag, redrawing or flicker
 X.Org Server: the official reference implementation of the X11 protocol
 XCB, an Xlib replacement.
 Xephyr is a display server

Other

 D-Bus, a message bus akin to DCOP (KDE 3) and Bonobo (GNOME 2)
 Elektra, a library for reading and writing configuration
FreeType, a text rendering library.
 fontconfig is a library for font discovery, name substitution, etc.
 fprint, a library for the consumer fingerprint reader devices
 Geoclue, a geoinformation service.
 GStreamer is a cross-platform multimedia framework.
 GTK-Qt engine, a GTK+ 2 engine which uses Qt to draw the graphical control elements, providing the same look and feel of KDE applications to GTK+2 applications.
 HAL (Hardware Abstraction Layer) is a consistent cross-operating system layer; it has been deprecated and replaced by udev.
 kmscon, userspace virtual console to replace Linux console, uses KMS driver and supports Unicode
 luit, a tool used by terminal emulators
 libinput, a library to handle input devices in Wayland compositors and to provide a generic X.Org input driver. It provides device detection, device handling, input device event processing and abstraction to minimize the amount of custom input code compositors need to provide the common set of functionality that users expect
 PulseAudio is a sound server frontend meant to provide software mixing, network audio, and per application volume control.
 PipeWire is a low-latency server for handling sandbox-friendly audio and video streams on Linux, which provides an implementation of PulseAudio, JACK, and ALSA as well as secure methods for screenshotting and screencasting on Wayland compositors.
 systemd is a comprehensive init framework to start and manage services and sessions meant to replace older init models.
 Xft, anti-aliased fonts using the FreeType library, rather than the old X core fonts.
 pkg-config is a helper program used to generate flags for compiler and linker to include necessary libraries.
Also, Avahi (a free Zeroconf implementation) started as a fd.o project but has since become a separate project.

Base Directory Specification 

XDG Base Directory Specification (XDG BDS) introduces a range of variables where user-specific files used by programs should be found. Many tools and applications utilize these variables by default.

User directories 
Besides the variables mentioned below, XDG BDS also specifies that users' local binary files may be installed into . Systems compliant with the spec are expected to make this directory available in their CLI's  environment variable.

 For user application's own data files
 Default to 

 For user's app configuration files
 Default to 

 For user-specific app session data, which should be stored for future reuse
 Default to 
 May include logs, recently used files, application-specific information (e.g. window layout, views, opened files, undo history, etc.), akin to session data that should be stored by app by request of system session manager, like X session manager

 For user-specific apps cache files
 Default to 

 For user-specific app runtime files like sockets which may survive reboot and logout cycles

System directories 

 Colon-separated list of preference-ordered paths to search for data files in
 Default to 

 The same as above but for config files
 Default to

Stated aims
The project aims to catch interoperability issues much earlier in the process. It is not for legislating formal standards. Stated goals include:

 Collect existing specifications, standards, and documents related to X desktop interoperability and make them available in a central location.
 Promote the development of new specifications and standards to be shared among multiple X desktops.
 Integrate desktop-specific standards into broader standards efforts, such as Linux Standard Base and the ICCCM.
 Work on the implementation of these standards in specific X desktops.
 Serve as a neutral forum for sharing ideas about X desktop technology.
 Implement technologies that further X desktop interoperability and free X desktops in general.
 Promote X desktops and X desktop standards to application authors, both commercial and volunteer.
 Communicate with the developers of free operating system kernels, the X Window System itself, free OS distributions, and so on to address desktop-related problems.
 Provide source repositories (git and CVS), web hosting, Bugzilla, mailing lists, and other resources to free software projects that work toward the above goals.

See also

 Comparison of open source software hosting facilities
 Linux on the desktop

References

Sources
 The Big freedesktop.org Interview (Rayiner Hashem & Eugenia Loli-Queru, OSNews, 24 November 2003)

External links
 

 
Free and open-source software organizations
Free software websites
Projects established in 2000
X Window System